Geleshan may refer to:

 Geleshan (歌乐山街道), a subdistrict in Shapingba District, Chongqing
 Geleshan Mountain Range, in which the subdistrict is named after
 Gele Mountain or Geleshan, located in the Geleshan Mountain Range
 Geleshan National Forest Park (歌乐山国家森林公园), a nationally protected park